Richard Edward Bensfield (June 18, 1926 – June 24, 2016) was an American producer and screenwriter. He is the creator of the American sitcom television series Hello, Larry, which he created with his writing partner Perry Grant.

Career 
Bensfield and Grant met in 1952 when both were writing for The Adventures of Ozzie and Harriet. They continues to write for the show until its last season.

Afterwards,Bensfield and Grant continued to work together, producing and writing for television programs including The Andy Griffith Show, The Odd Couple, I Dream of Jeannie, Good Times, Mayberry R.F.D., The Doris Day Show, Happy Days, One Day at a Time, The Partridge Family, The Jeffersons, 227 and The Lucy Show.

In 1979 Bensfield and Grant created the new NBC sitcom television series Hello, Larry, which starred McLean Stevenson, Kim Richards and Joanna Gleason. He retired from television in 1987.

Death 
Bensfield died in June 2016, after battling with parkinson's disease, at the age of 90.

References

External links 

1926 births
2016 deaths
People from Los Angeles
Neurological disease deaths in the United States
Deaths from Parkinson's disease
American male screenwriters
American television writers
Television producers from California
American male television writers
American television producers